Liu Yongshi (Simplified Chinese:, born 19 February 1990) is a Chinese fencer from Guangzhou. She competed in the women's foil event at the 2016 Summer Olympics.

References

External links
 

1990 births
Living people
Chinese female fencers
Chinese female foil fencers
Olympic fencers of China
Fencers at the 2016 Summer Olympics
Asian Games medalists in fencing
Fencers at the 2014 Asian Games
Asian Games silver medalists for China
Medalists at the 2014 Asian Games
Fencers from Guangzhou
21st-century Chinese women